Buchi Atuonwu, popularly known as Buchi, is a Nigerian reggae gospel artist. He started as a disc jockey in night clubs.

Buchi is part of Christ Embassy's LoveWorld Music and Arts Ministry.

Personal life 
Buchi was born in Kaduna in 1965. He has lived most of his life in Lagos.

Education 
Buchi started his education in Enugu in Methodist College, and Federal Government College. He gained admission to University of Lagos in 1983 to study English language and literary studies. He graduated with a BA and MA in 1986 and 1988 respectively. He took up an appointment with the university at the end of his program to lecture and run a PhD program. Buchi remained a staff member of the Department of English of the university until 1994  when he started writing and singing in the reggae genre.

Albums
Buchi has released 8 Studio albums and 2 books. The audio albums are as follows:
 1999 - These Days
 2002 - So Beatutiful
2005 - What A Life
 2008 - Sounds Of Life
 2011 - Judah
2014 - I See
2017 - Red, Gold & Green
2020 - 11:59

Books 

 Cease Fire

References

Living people
1963 births
Nigerian songwriters
Nigerian gospel singers
University of Lagos alumni
People from Kaduna
Loveworld Records artists
Federal Government College Enugu alumni